San Antonio Huista is a town and municipality in the Guatemalan department of Huehuetenango. It is located 362 kilometers from Guatemala City. The predominant language is Spanish, while approximately 20% of the population speak indigenous languages, the majority speaking Mam. The municipality of San Antonio Huista is situated at 1240 metres above sea level, with a population of 16,697 (2018 census). It covers an area of 60.4 km2. The annual festival is December 8–12 dedicated to the Virgin of Guadalupe and the patron saint's day (Saint Anthony of Padua) is celebrated June 11–13.

References

External links
San Antonio's municipal website
Inforpress's San Antonio entry

Municipalities of the Huehuetenango Department